Allen Peter (born 15 September 1995) is a Solomon Islands footballer who plays as a defender for Laugu United. He made his debut for the national team on March 24, 2016 in their 2–0 victory against Papua New Guinea.

References

Living people
1995 births
Association football defenders
Solomon Islands international footballers
Solomon Islands footballers